The Deal is a rap music video television program that premiered on November 10, 2008, on BET. It was the successor to nineteen-year-long Rap City. The program aired for one hour.  Its hosts were Memphitz and DJ Diamond Kuts. The Deal began airing each weekday afternoon at 5 p.m. On November 24, 2008, it moved to weekday mornings at 3 a.m.  Despite limited promotion and a poor time slot, the Deal gained popularity via word of mouth. In November 2009, it moved to Saturdays at 2 a.m. It was shown on Mondays at 3 p.m. on BET UK. The Deal was canceled in August 2010.

External links
 http://www.c21media.net/news/detail.asp?area=4&article=45711

2000s American music television series
2010s American music television series
2008 American television series debuts
2010 American television series endings
BET original programming
Hip hop television